Hartwell is a surname. Notable people with the surname include:

Abraham Hartwell (1553–1606), English translator and antiquarian
Alfred S. Hartwell (1836–1912), American Civil War officer and Hawaii judge
Ambrose Hartwell (1883–??), English footballer
Michael Berry, Baron Hartwell (1911–2001), newspaper proprietor
Calvin Hartwell (died 1920), Mayor of Pasadena, California (1896–98)
Charles Hartwell (1825–1905), American missionary
Charles Leonard Hartwell (1873–1951), British sculptor
David G. Hartwell (1941–2016), American science fiction and fantasy editor
Edgerton Hartwell (born 1978), former American footballer
J. Hartwell Harrison (1909–1984, American urologic surgeon and educator
Josh Hartwell (1869–1940), 19th-century American college football coach
Leland H. Hartwell (born 1939), President and director of the Fred Hutchinson Cancer Research Center, Seattle; 2001 Nobel Prize laureate
Lori Hartwell, Founder and president of the Renal Support Network
Martin Hartwell, Canadian bush pilot
Mary Hartwell (1847-1902), American author better known as Mary Hartwell Catherwood
Ronald Max Hartwell (1921-2009, Australian-born economic historian
William Hartwell (1880–??), English footballer
Erin Hartwell, American Cyclist.

Fictional characters:
Harley Hartwell, character from the manga series Case Closed
Walter Hartwell White (Breaking Bad)